Peter John McCann (25 June 1882 – 16 August 1961) was an Australian rules footballer who played with South Melbourne and Essendon in the Victorian Football League (VFL).

Notes

External links 

1882 births
1961 deaths
Australian rules footballers from New South Wales
Sydney Swans players
Essendon Football Club players